Pointr is a startup company based in London specialized in indoor positioning and navigation utilising iBeacons, which are Bluetooth Low Energy devices formalised by Apple Inc. Pointr have created a GPS-like experience with true position and turn-by-turn navigation that is supported by most modern smartphones operating on both Android and iOS. Analytics and messaging modules can be added on to help communicate with users and understand venue usage respectively.

The features are provided through a software package (SDK) which aims to improve user experience whilst connecting the online and offline worlds. Many of the features are available without an internet connection, including sending messages between users with a form of Mesh networking, however for intelligent offers and live analytics then an internet connection is required.  The markets where the technology is most frequently used are retail, exhibition centres, airports and museums, but there are a number of uses in hospitals, warehouses, offices and entertainment venues as well.  The majority of software development is done in their office in Istanbul, with specialist modules created in London. The technology is commonly used in permanent installations where the SDK is offered with a license fee model, however some installations have been temporary and hence one-off payments have been used.

History

Pointr was founded in November 2013 by Ege Akpinar under the name Indoorz; he was then joined by co-founders Axel Katalan, Chris Charles and Can Akpinar in early 2014. The software was developed for seven months before launching, allowing time to build and test the product.  In November 2014 the company adopted its current name of Pointr after receiving a client question about whether it could work outdoors as well.  Pointr raised its first round of angel funding in January 2015 and has grown steadily with its first customers in retail, warehouses, offices and libraries.  In February 2015, Pointr was accepted onto the Microsoft Ventures accelerator program based in Liverpool Street, London.  Pointr are also supported by Level 39 (the Fintech Accelerator programme for Canary Wharf Group) and have installed their technology there to locate colleagues and assist new users navigating the venue.

References

External links 
 

2014 software
Android (operating system) software
IOS software
Indoor positioning system